Cezanne Khan is an Indian television actor. He is known for his role of Anurag Basu in Kasautii Zindagi Kay, that aired on Star Plus. He has also worked in Pakistani television series.

Early life
Khan was born into a Muslim family in Mumbai, Maharashtra, India. His father was Ustad Rais Khan, a famous sitarist in Pakistan. His mother, Tasnim Khan, is an interior designer, whose family also resides in Karachi, Pakistan. His brother, Suhail Khan, is a singer, composer and  sitar player.

He was named after the famous French painter Paul Cézanne.

Khan went to boarding school at Barnes in Deolali. He earned his Bachelor of Commerce from M.M.K. College of Commerce & Economics in Bandra, Bombay.

Career
During his college days, he was involved with modelling and theatre. After Cezanne finished his B.Com, he was supposed to join NMIMS (Narsee Monjee Institute of Management Studies) for MBA when he was offered a film. This film never released, but it served to prompt him leave his MBA to pursue a career in acting. It was at this point that his television career began. Anubhav Sinha offered him a role in his TV serial, Hasratein, on Zee TV and he accepted the offer. And soon after, he got Neena Gupta's Pal Chhin and Balaji Telefilms's Kaliren. He also did a bit of acting in B.R.Films' serial Dushman. Meanwhile, Ekta Kapoor was doing the auditions for Kasautii Zindagi Kay (KZK) and offered him the role of Anurag Basu. KZK catapulted Cezanne into a household name. As the shy and meek Anurag Basu in KZK, he gained immense popularity. KZK is one of the top serials of Star Plus.

He got his name from the famous French painter Paul Cezanne. But the Indian entertainment world often confused him with Hrithik Roshan's wife Suzanne Khan. However, after Kasautii Zindagi Kay, he was soon known by a different name altogether - Anurag Basu.

"I agree that I am more popular as Anurag than by my real name. The role surely is the turning point in my career," says the actor. Due to his immense popularity, he is getting film offers as well. "But I want a lead role and no less. It should also be good and substantial," he seems to have made up his mind.

Cezanne's look in KZK "Though I think looks do matter initially, something like an identity card, but as you move on from one role to the other on television, you have to have substance in you to carry you forward. You should have the charisma to impress the audience to watch you day after day," says Cezanne.

In June 2007, Cezanne Khan entered  Sony TV's  Ek Ladki Anjaani Si as Dr. Dhruv Mehra.

Khan also hosted The Good Health Show on Zee TV for some time. He acted in two Pakistani TV serials - Piya Kay Ghar Jana Hai aired on ARY Digital in 2006 and Silsilay Chahat Ke in 2007.
He returned to TV after 9 Years in a lead role as Harman Singh in Rashmi Sharma's TV show Shakti - Astitva Ke Ehsaas Ki, replacing Vivian Dsena opposite Rubina Dilaik.

Television

Awards and nominations

See also 
 List of Indian television actors

References

Indian male television actors
Living people
Male actors from Mumbai
Indian male soap opera actors
Indian expatriate male actors in Pakistan
Year of birth missing (living people)